Nobusada is a masculine Japanese given name. Notable people with the name include:

Obata Nobusada (1534–1582), Japanese general
Yanagawa Nobusada, Japanese ukiyo-e artist

See also
Nobutada

Japanese masculine given names